Laguna BelAir Science School (LBASS, or BelAir) was a science and math oriented private school located in Santa Rosa City, Laguna, Philippines. The school's curriculum is patterned after that of the Philippine Science High School System. The school was founded on February 13, 1997, with an emphasis on science and mathematics.

In March of 2021 due to the effects of the pandemic, they announced that they will be closing down the school year after 2021-2022. It has been 25 years of service for the school.

References

External links

 Elementary schools in the Philippines
 Science high schools in the Philippines
 Schools in Santa Rosa, Laguna
 Educational institutions established in 1996
1996 establishments in the Philippines